The second generation Honda Fit is a subcompact car or supermini manufactured by Honda from 2007 to 2014. It debuted on 17 October 2007 at the 40th Tokyo Motor Show. 



Overview 

The vehicle offered a longer wheelbase than its predecessor and is wider and longer overall. Multi-mode seating and cargo configurations were retained (US models were no longer capable of Refresh/Relax Mode until the following gen), with redesigned headrests enabling more convenient folding of the rear seats. At its introduction in 2007, it won the Car of the Year Japan Award for the second time. 

Two engines were offered in the second-generation Fit. This engine was offered in both European and Asian markets. This was the only engine available in the American market, in addition to being available in several Asian markets including Japan and Malaysia. A five-speed manual, five-speed automatic (4WD only) and CVT transmission were available.

The chassis was re-engineered, with structural rigidity increased by 164 percent over the first-generation Fit.

The second-generation Fit was claimed to feature improved ride and handling.

Markets

Japan

Japanese sales began in October 2007. Facelifted models, and the hybrid version, arrived in October 2010. Models available in Japan are the 1.3-litre and 1.5-litre variants consisting of the 13G, 15XH and the top-of-the-line RS.

In 2007, aftermarket tuner Mugen, introduced a new line of accessories for the Japanese-market 2008 Honda Fit. On 17 January 2008, they introduced the Mugen Fit F154SC at the 2008 Tokyo Auto Salon. Other upgrades include full coilover suspension, exhaust, intake, and brakes. Body modifications include a widened track to feed more air into the engine bay.

North America
Although the second-generation Honda Fit was introduced in the Japanese market in 2007, the first-generation Fit was still sold in the North American market for the 2008 model year. The second-generation Fit for the North American market was unveiled on March 19, 2008, at the New York International Auto Show for the 2009 model year. To comply with Canada Motor Vehicle Safety Standards (CMVSS) and improve crash test ratings, the North American Fit's front overhang is several inches longer; the rear bumper is longer too.

The second-generation Honda Fit went on sale in North America on August 26, 2008, for the 2009 model year. It was considered the most expensive within the subcompact class when equipped as such, but was also described as modestly priced. It was reported in September 2009 that Honda was considering producing the Fit in North America in response to the increasing strength of the Japanese yen against the U.S. dollar.

The base Fit comes with 15-inch wheels with covers, power windows, a tilt and telescoping steering wheel, a 160-watt AM/FM/CD audio system with four speakers, a 12-volt power outlet, and other features. The Fit Sport adds a ground appearance package,  alloy wheels, paddle shifters, a security system, fog lights, chrome exhaust finisher, a leather-wrapped steering wheel, steering wheel-mounted audio controls, floor mats, a 6-speaker AM/FM/CD audio system, and other features. For the first time, a navigation system is introduced to the Fit as an option on the Fit Sport trim.

For the 2011 models, Vehicle Stability Assist, cruise control, remote entry and USB audio interface became standard across all trim levels. In addition, the Fit Sport now comes with carpeted floor mats.

For the 2012 facelift, the Fit Sport features a new front bumper cover and grille, black headlight bezels, dark "machined surface" finish alloy wheels, a black monochrome theme interior with chrome accents. The base model receives body-color exterior mirrors (previously black), standard security system, and new wheel covers.

Canadian trims include the DX (two speakers, black door handles and side mirrors), DX-A (adds factory-installed air conditioning), LX (adds among other things, body-colored door handles and side mirrors, 15-inch lightweight alloy wheels from the Civic Hybrid and DX-G, rear spoiler, power locks and remote entry, rear speakers for a total of four, cruise control) and Fit Sport (adds USB jack and Vehicle Stability Assist). The Fit Sport is similar to its American counterpart, however a navigation system is not offered as an option.

Brazil
The Sumaré-built new Fit was introduced in October 2008 in Brazil at the Sao Paulo Auto Show. There are four versions: LX and LXL, with the 1.35-litre (marketed as 1.4) 16V engine, and EX and EXL, with the 1.5-litre 16V engine. Both engines have VTEC and flex fuel capabilities as standard. Manual and automatic – both five-speed – gearboxes are offered; CVT was no longer available.

Malaysia
The second-generation Fit was launched as the Jazz in Malaysia in August 2008. Two models were available: Grade S and Grade V. In June 2009, a limited edition Grade S Modulo variant was launched limited to 100 units. In April 2011, the facelift model was officially launched with a sole Grade V variant being available. In August 2012, the sole Grade V variant was replaced with a Grade S variant that saw a reduction in price and a reduction in equipment. Lastly, in July 2013, Jazz was sold in Malaysia as a locally assembled model. Thus far, second generation Jazz's had been fully imported from Thailand. Only one variant was available though dubbed Grade S. It comes in a blue-black fabric upholstery for the interior, 4-speakers, a CD/MP3/WMA player with USB and AUX jack, immobiliser and 4 corner reverse sensors.

All second generation Jazz sold in Malaysia came with a 1.5-litre i-VTEC engine with an automatic gearbox.

Singapore
The second-generation Fit/Jazz was available from parallel importers and the authorized dealer in Singapore. The authorized dealer sells the Jazz in two variants 1.3 L and the 1.5-litre having similar specifications as the parallel imported Fit but does not adopt the RS grade for the 1.5 model. The Jazz was launched later from the authorized dealer in 2009.

Thailand
The second-generation Fit was marketed in Thailand as the Jazz. The second generation model has been unveiled on 23 March 2008. 3 trim levels were offered, which were S, V and SV. Cars with the S trim level will have 5-speed manual and 5-speed automatic transmission while the V and SV trims with only automatic transmissions. All trim levels have the 1.5-litre 16V engine with i-VTEC, ABS and CD/MP3 radio. The Jazz in Thailand gets a facelift in January 2011 with new front grille and rear bumper, sees an addition of front dual airbags across the range and front fog lights in SV models.

In early 2012, the Thai government allowed Honda Thailand to import the Jazz and Accord models from Japan to serve buyers in Thailand without any additional excise and import tax, due to a flood in the Honda plant in Ayutthaya province. The Japan-imported Jazz came with HID headlights and six airbags.

The Jazz hybrid was launched in Thailand in July 2012, the first hybrid in the country's sub-compact market. First time buyers of the car are eligible for Thai government's first car tax rebate. The Jazz that is built in Thailand were exported to the Philippines and Australia.

Philippines
The second-generation Jazz was launched in October 2008 with two trim levels; 1.3 S and 1.5 V. The 1.3 S was available in 5-speed manual or 5-speed automatic while the 1.5 V was only available in 5-speed automatic with paddle shifters and receives a different style alloy wheels. In 2011 a facelift version was launched. It received newly designed front bumpers and new alloy wheels for both 1.3-litre and 1.5-litre variants and fog lights are now available in the 1.5-litre variants.

Indonesia
The second-generation Jazz was launched on 27 June 2008, sold in S and RS variants. In 2008, the total sales of Honda Jazz in Indonesia was 24,969 units, ranked 5th in total for the best-selling passenger car in Indonesia. In 2009, sales fell to 15,713 as economic activities slowed down but sales ranking improved to the fourth best-selling passenger car of the country. As of the end of November 2010, sales of Jazz totaled 20,581 unit for the year. As of June 2014, totaled 228,500 units Honda Jazz were sold since early 2004, making it the segment leader. In mid-2011, the Jazz underwent a minor change including the redesigned front grille, the new front/rear bumper, and LED tail lights. In early 2013, the Jazz went through minor changes, including a new headlight and tail light accents, added an upper spoiler as standard, new wheels, a new audio system, and the 'RS' badge on the grille. The S trim received the chrome grille.

India
Launched as Jazz in India in June 2009 with 26 percent import content. It was manufactured by Honda Cars India Limited at its factory in Greater Noida. In India, the car is powered by 1.2-litre i-VTEC engine, as the government imposes higher tax for vehicles with petrol engines larger than 1,200 cc. Honda Cars India postpones the introduction of the third generation Jazz up to 2015, citing production limitations.

Australia
The second-generation Jazz was available in Australia, albeit initially without electronic stability control (known as Vehicle Stability Control in Honda nomenclature). Honda introduced the feature at the end of 2010. Stability Control has since become standard on all Jazzes sold. Until the end of 2011 the Australian Jazz was sourced from Thailand. However, due to the 2011 flooding in Thailand, Honda Australia sourced two special editions of Jazz from Japan from early 2012 until Honda's plant in Thailand resumed production. The Japan-produced Vibe and Vibe S replaced the existing GLi and VTi prefixed models.

Europe
On 28 July 2008, Honda UK announced that the second-generation Jazz would be on sale from 17 October 2008. Honda also announced the introduction of an optional new "I-SHIFT" automated manual gearbox replacing the traditional automatic CVT gearbox that had been available on the previous model.

Production of the Jazz for European markets moved from Japan to Honda's UK plant in Swindon on 7 October 2009.

Facelifted models and the new hybrid model went on sale on 1 February 2011. Aerodynamics improvement help the Cd drop from 0.336 to 0.330. Engine modifications result in a drop of carbon emission of two grams to 123 g/km for 1.2-litre engine and 126 g/km for 1.4-litre engine respectively. CVT transmission was available on cars with the larger engine.

Fit Hybrid (2010)

Sales of the Fit Hybrid began in Japan in October 2010. At its introduction, the hybrid version was the cheapest petrol-hybrid electric vehicle sold in Japan. The Fit Hybrid featured a 1.3-litre engine and electric motor, with an estimated fuel economy of  measured in accordance with Japanese 10–15 cycle. The car used a parallel hybrid system that works in tandem with the petrol engine. The parallel hybrid system is simple and lightweight while enhancing driving performance and fuel economy.

The European version, called Jazz Hybrid, was unveiled at the 2010 Paris Motor Show and became available in early 2011. Honda Fit/Jazz for the European and Japanese markets featured revised headlights, new front grille, a leather seating option and a new Lime Green exterior color choice. It has the lowest carbon emission of automatic car in the B-segment. When the car is driven in a low and steady speed, the car switches to EV mode, and releases no carbon emissions: the engine shuts down, and the car is powered solely by the electric motor.

A compact Intelligent Power Unit (IPU) is located under the rear cargo area, the Jazz Hybrid maintains the same fully adjustable seating configuration as the petrol-powered model and the same spacious area for optimum use and storage.

With the fuel tank placed in the center, plus an ultra-thin electric motor and compact IPU, it claims to achieve an efficient weight distribution.

In an interview, Kohei Hitomi, the project leader of Fit hybrid, admitted that lowering CO2 further will affect some attributes that buyers of the car value: a bigger electric motor and battery sacrifice spaces utility, and improving aerodynamics might make side mirrors smaller. He said there are benefits for customers to keep all the versatility. The drivetrain is the same drive system as the Honda Insight. The advantages of the system are low cost, low weight and that it can be combined with either manual transmission or continuous variable transmission. The car is better-suited than its diesel competitors in areas where superminis are most common: city centres. It is more economical in urban conditions. Thanks to the instant torque of the electric motor, it has a much better engine response.

The hybrid version was not available in the United States. According to Koichi Kondo, Executive Vice President of Honda:
"As for the future, it's open to question. We will carefully be watching the market situation." Hitomi, as reported by Automotive News, believed that the second-generation Fit offered in the North American market had very good fuel mileage, as it was and questioned if buyers were willing to pay extra for marginal mileage gains.

It is reported about 86,000 Fit Hybrid are sold in 2011.

In Malaysia, the Fit hybrid was called Jazz hybrid. Honda introduced the hybrid model to Malaysia in March 2012.

Honda produced the Jazz hybrid in Malaysia from late 2012. Honda was the largest hybrid vehicle seller in Malaysia in 2011 and by 2012 Malaysia was Honda's largest hybrid vehicle market in Southeast Asia.

It was reported that Honda would introduce the Fit hybrid to China during 2012.

The Jazz hybrid was launched in Thailand in July 2012, the first hybrid in the country's subcompact market. First time buyers of the car were eligible for Thai government's first car tax rebate. The hybrid model is assembled in Thailand.

Fit Shuttle and Fit Shuttle hybrid (2011)

The Fit Shuttle is a compact station wagon derived from the second generation Fit and is available in Japan's domestic market. The Shuttle is also a successor to the station wagon variant of first generation Fit, sold as the Airwave. The car leverages the efficient packaging of Fit and Fit hybrid.

The launch of the car in June 2011 was pushed back from March as a result of the earthquake and tsunami in Japan on March 11, 2011. Production of the car was transferred from Honda's Sayama plant in Saitama Prefecture to Suzuka plant in Mie Prefecture as a result of power rationing after the quake. Production began in early May 2011. The Fit Shuttle was shortlisted for Car of The Year Japan 2012.

Its drivetrains are shared with the Fit. A hybrid version, the Fit Shuttle hybrid, was also available, with a 1.3-litre i-VTEC engine with IMA. Continuously variable transmission was the only transmission available for FWD models. A five-speed auto transmission was standard on four-wheel-drive models.

The fuel efficiency of the station wagon and its hybrid variant was enhanced to be the same as that of Fit and Fit hybrid by reducing engine friction, front brake rolling resistance, improvement in aerodynamics and improvement of control efficiency of the hybrid system. All models feature ECON Mode for enhancing real-world fuel economy. Hybrid model has Eco Assist (Ecological Drive Assist System) to help the driver engage in fuel-efficient driving practices. It went on sale on 16 June 2011, in Japan.

The Fit Shuttle comes with a double-hinged two-piece load floor that both allows access to an under-floor storage bin and also functions as a divider for the cargo area. Through better sound dampening and insulation, the Fit Shuttle is pledged to be as quiet as a mid-size sedan.

Fit EV 
Honda showed a concept electric vehicle with the Honda Fit styling in 2010, and did a limited production of Honda Fit EV in 2013–2015.

Concept vehicle 

The Fit EV concept electric car had its global debut in the 2010 Los Angeles Auto Show. The concept uses a motor derived from Honda FCX Clarity hydrogen fuel cell vehicle, that, in sport mode, gives the driving feel of a car with a 2.0-litre petrol engine. The vehicle is paired with an exclusive interactive key fob that enable the driver to view the battery's state of charge, initiate charging, and activate the vehicle's climate control all without a cell-phone or an Internet connection. The car can also pair with mobile app and web site that allows drivers to set the vehicle's charging schedule for the best utility rates, locates charging stations and provides 24/7 roadside assistance.

Demonstration program 
Honda started the Electric Vehicle Testing Program in the cities of Saitama, Kumagaya and Chichibu, Saitama Prefecture, and Amakusa area, Kumamoto Prefecture, Japan, for its next-generation personal mobility products, including Fit EV in December 2010.

A demonstration program with pre-production vehicles began in Guangzhou, China in early November 2011. Another program, called Honda Electric Vehicle Demonstration Program, is taking place in California, in partnership with Stanford University, the city of Torrance and Google. The electric vehicle joins Google's GFleet, a car-sharing service for employees. Stanford uses the electric vehicle to study differences in the psychological and physical reaction of using battery-electric vehicles and driving a traditional petrol-powered vehicle.

The first 2013 Fit EV demonstrator was delivered to the city of Torrance in January 2012. Stanford and Google received their demonstrators in February 2012.

Production model 
The 2013 model year production Fit EV was unveiled at the November 2011 Los Angeles Auto Show. Vehicles for the U.S. market were limited to 1,100 units through October 2014.

Initial availability was limited to California and Oregon, and sales were scheduled to begin in selected markets in Massachusetts, Connecticut, Maryland, New York, and New Jersey by late February 2013. Certified dealers for Fit EV increased from 36 to 200 by the middle of 2013.  The Fit EV was released through leasing to local government and corporate customers in Japan in August 2012. Availability in Japan was limited to 200 units during its first two years.

The car is based on the Fit compact car platform, powered by a lithium-ion battery pack combined with an AC synchronous, permanent magnet coaxial traction motor and low-friction reduction gearbox borrowed from the Honda FCX Clarity hydrogen fuel cell vehicle. Honda also said that recharging the Fit EV will take 12 hours from a 120-volt outlet and four hours with a 240-volt supply.

The Fit EV was surpassed in December 2012 by Scion iQ EV, a two-seater, with a rating of 121 MPGe combined. Energy consumption is 29 kW·h per 100 miles, and the fuel economy rating for city driving is 132 MPGe and 105 MPGe for highway. The Fit EV employs Toshiba's SCiB batteries that can be recharged to 80% capacity in 15 minutes and can be recharged up to 4,000 times, more than 2.5 times that of other Li-ion batteries. The battery cells use lithium titanate oxide in the anode, providing rapid charge times and extending battery life. It also provides stable discharge from extremely cold (-30 °C) to high temperature above 40 °C. According to Honda, the SCiB battery can charge in about half the time of a typical Li-ion battery.

Honda Fit EV, like the Honda CR-Z hybrid, will have three distinct driving modes: econ, normal, and sport. Honda explained that "econ" mode will extend the driving range by 17% compared to the normal mode; in sport mode, the Fit EV imitates the acceleration of a small car with a 2.0-litre petrol engine. The production version is equipped with a 20 kWh lithium-ion battery and 92 kW coaxial electric motor. The new electric motor is up to 98 percent efficient, contrast to the typical 15 percent efficiency of a petrol engine. The battery can be recharged in four hours from a 240-volt outlet.

In July 2014, Honda announced the end of production of the Fit EV for the 2015 model, together with the Honda Insight hybrid and the Honda FCX Clarity hydrogen fuel-cell car. A total of 1,070 new units were leased in the United States through April 2015. In March 2015 Honda offered a two-year lease extension to existing lessees, and also to new customers on used cars, at a reduced priced of  a month with no down payment. In both cases there is no purchase option at the end of the lease.

Safety

References

External links 

Fit / Jazz at Honda Worldwide
Honda Fit official website(US)
Honda Electric Vehicles
Honda Fit Hybrid video at Honda World site

Fit
Cars introduced in 2007
2010s cars
Subcompact cars
Hatchbacks
Front-wheel-drive vehicles
All-wheel-drive vehicles
Euro NCAP superminis
Vehicles with CVT transmission
Hybrid electric cars
Production electric cars